Rajnold Suchodolski (1804 – 8 September 1831, Warsaw) was a Polish poet.

He was brother of the painter January Suchodolski. Rajnold participated and died in the November Uprising of 1830–1831.

Works 
 Among others "Polonez Kościuszki" in "Ulubione pieśni" (1831).

1804 births
1831 deaths
Polish poets
November Uprising participants
19th-century poets